The 185th Paratroopers Artillery Regiment "Folgore is an artillery regiment of the Italian Army, specializing in airborne operations. Today the regiment is based in Bracciano near Rome and operationally assigned to the Paratroopers Brigade "Folgore".

History

World War II 

The first Italian paratroopers artillery unit, the I Paratroopers Artillery Group, was formed on 28 August 1941 at the Royal Air Force Paratroopers School in Tarquinia. The group was equipped with 47/32 cannons. On 15 January 1942 the II Paratroopers Artillery Group was raised, followed by the III Paratroopers Artillery Group on 10 March 1942. On the same date the Paratroopers Division Artillery Regiment was raised and assigned to the Paratroopers Division. The regiment fielded 24 47/32 cannons: 8 per group, which each consisted of two batteries of 4 cannons.

On 27 July the division was renamed 185th Paratroopers Division "Folgore" and the artillery regiment was renamed 185th Artillery Regiment "Folgore". The regiment fought in the Western Desert Campaign. It was disbanded on 8 December 1942 due to the losses it had suffered during the Second Battle of El Alamein.

Cold War 
On 1 July 1958 the Paratroopers Field Artillery Battery was raised and assigned to the 1st Paratroopers Tactical Group. The battery was equipped with four Mod 56 105mm pack howitzers. On 1 June 1963 the battery was expanded to the Paratroopers Artillery Group with two howitzer batteries and a command unit. On 16 December 1966 the group received the flag of the 185th Artillery Regiment "Folgore".

During the 1975 army reform the group was renamed on 1 October 1975 185th Paratroopers Field Artillery Group "Viterbo". On 2 December of the same year the group raised a third howitzer battery, while the command unit was expanded to Command and Services Battery. From now on the group fielded 18 Mod 56 105mm pack howitzers.

In 1981 the group received 18 F1 120mm mortars, allowing the group to deploy either with howitzers or mortars or a mix of the two. On 1 July 1988 the group raised the Anti-aircraft Battery "Scorpioni", which was equipped with FIM-92 Stinger man-portable air-defense systems. On 8 September 1992 the group changed its name to 1st Paratroopers Artillery Group and entered the reformed 185th Paratroopers Artillery Regiment "Folgore". The organization of the regiment at that time was as follows:

  Regimental Command, in Livorno
 Command and Services Battery "Leoni"
 Anti-aircraft Battery "Scorpioni"
 1st Paratroopers Artillery Group
 1st Howitzer/Mortar Battery "Draghi"
 2nd Howitzer/Mortar Battery "Le Aquile"
 3rd Howitzer/Mortar Battery "Diavoli"
 Fire Direction and Technical Support Battery "Levrieri"

The regiment also increased the number of howitzers and mortars in each battery from six to eight.

Recent times 

In winter 1999–2000 the regiment was transformed into a special operations reconnaissance unit and therefore on 31 August 2000 the Anti-aircraft Battery and the Fire Direction and Technical Support Battery were disbanded, while the regiment changed its name to 185th Field Artillery Regiment (Paratroopers Target Acquisition) "Folgore". The regiment's new structure was as follows:

  Regimental Command, in Livorno
 Command and Services Battery "Leoni"
 1st Target Acquisition Group
 1st Target Acquirers Battery "Draghi"
 2nd Target Acquirers Battery "Le Aquile"
 3rd Target Acquirers Battery "Diavoli"
 4th Long Range Reconnaissance Patrol Battery "Diavoli" (transferred in July 2003 from the 9th Paratroopers Assault Regiment "Col Moschin".

Due to is new role the regiment changed its name in 2004 to 185th Paratroopers Reconnaissance Target Acquisition Regiment "Folgore".

On 1 July 2013 the 185th Paratroopers Artillery Regiment "Folgore" was reformed as artillery unit in Bracciano with personnel and materiel of the 33rd Field Artillery Regiment "Acqui", whose flag was transferred to the Shrine of the Flags in the Vittoriano in Rome. The 185th Paratroopers Artillery Regiment "Folgore" received its flag from the 185th Paratroopers Reconnaissance Target Acquisition Regiment "Folgore", which in turn received the flag of the 185th Paratroopers Regiment "Nembo", which had served with the Italian Co-Belligerent Army during the Italian campaign of World War II.

Deployments 

The first deployment outside of Italy for the 185th Paratroopers Artillery Regiment "Folgore" since World War II came in 1982, when a battery of the artillery group participated in the United Nations Interim Force in Lebanon. In 1991, as part of the Italfor Airone Mission, the group contributed to Paratroopers Tactical Group, which deployed to Northern Iraq in the aftermath of Operation Desert Storm. The 185th Paratroopers Artillery Regiment "Folgore" was the first unit deployed in the national Operation "Vespri Siciliani", and immediately afterwards deployed a mortar battery to Somalia. The 185th Paratroopers Artillery Regiment "Folgore" was also deployed to the Italian peacekeeping missions in Bosnia and Kosovo.

Current structure
As of 2023 the 185th Paratroopers Artillery Regiment "Folgore" consists of:

  Regimental Command, in Bracciano
 Command and Logistic Support Battery "Leoni"
 1st Paratroopers Artillery Group "Viterbo"
 1st Heavy Mortar Battery "Draghi"
 2nd Heavy Mortar Battery "Le Aquile"
 3rd Howitzer Battery
 Surveillance and Technical Support Battery "Levrieri"

The Command and Logistic Support Battery fields the following sections: C3 Section, Transport and Materiel Section, Medical Section, and Commissariat Section. The heavy mortar batteries are equipped with MO-120 RT 120mm mortars, while the howitzer battery is equipped with Mod 56 105mm pack howitzers.

Military honors 
After World War II the President of Italy awarded the 185th Paratroopers Artillery Regiment "Folgore" Italy's highest military honor, the Gold Medal of Military Valour for the regiment's conduct and sacrifice during the Western Desert Campaign and at the Second Battle of El Alamein:

  Western Desert Campaign and Second Battle of El Alamein, awarded 26 March 1963

See also 
 Paratroopers Brigade "Folgore"

External links
Italian Army Website: 185° Reggimento Artiglieria Paracadutisti "Folgore"

References

Airborne units and formations of Italy
Artillery Regiments of Italy
Military units and formations established in 2013
Bracciano